Mahathma Gandhi College, Iritty is one of the educational institutes in Iritty. It operates under the Iritty Educational Society, and is aided by the Government of Kerala. The college started functioning on 13 July 1995. Initially, the college was affiliated to the University of Calicut. At present the college is affiliated to Kannur University. The college was accredited by the NAAC with 'A' grade in 2016.

The college offers bachelor's degrees in six main subjects.  It also offers post-graduate courses in Commerce and Mathematics.

Courses Offered
Undergraduate programmes:
 B.B.A.
 B.Com
 B.Sc Computer Science
 B.Sc Mathematics
 B.Sc Physics
 B.Sc Chemistry

Postgraduate programmes:
 M.Com
 M.Sc Mathematics

References

External links
College website: https://www.mgcollege.ac.in

Colleges in Kerala
Universities and colleges in Kannur district
Arts and Science colleges in Kerala
Colleges affiliated to Kannur University
Educational institutions in India with year of establishment missing